Illumø is a small uninhabited Danish island lying south west of Funen. Illumø covers an area of 0.90 km2.

There is no ferry connection from the mainland to the island.

References 

Geography of Faaborg-Midtfyn Municipality
Danish islands in the Baltic
Islands of Denmark